Tamralipta Mahavidyalaya, established in 1948, is one of the oldest colleges in Purba Medinipur district. It offers undergraduate courses in arts, commerce and sciences. It is affiliated to  Vidyasagar University.

History
Since the opening session 1948–49, the college was affiliated to the University of Calcutta in English, Bengali, Sanskrit, History, Logic, Civics, Commercial Geography, Commercial Arithmetic, Elements of Book Keeping to I.A. standard and organizers were motivated to introduce I.Sc. course from the very next session. From the very beginning of the Commerce department was run in the evening in the interest of the otherwise employed students. But with the increasing tendency of the girl students to study commerce, the department was shifted from the evening to the morning. In view of the ever-increasing need and demand of the locality, Calcutta University offered affiliation in Honours Course in Bengali, English, Chemistry, History, Political Science, Mathematics, Economics and Accountancy at degree level in quick succession. But since 1985, the affiliation of the colleges of undivided Midnapore district was changed from C.U. to V.U. by the Govt. policy and affiliation in Honours course was obtained from V.U. in Physics, Zoology, Botany, Physiology, Philosophy and Sanskrit. Recently, self-financed courses in Geography, Education, Physical Education, Computer science have been introduced. The college is now more or less equipped with a good no. of faculty members, technical staff and ministerial staff. The college is governed by a well-coordinated Governing Body. Very recently the college has been accredited by NAAC with 'A' Grage (CGPA = 3.12, highest in the district).

Result (Under Graduate)
Bengali department of our college got a fabulous result. The Department of Commerce got a great result after few years and this success came through Samiran Maji, the topper of Commerce Department of our college.

Location
The college is located in the heart of Tamluk in the Purba Medinipur district. Tamluk Central Bus Stand is 1 km from the college.

Departments

Science

Chemistry
Physics
Mathematics
Computer Science
Physiology
Botany
Zoology (UG & PG)
Economics
Geography

Arts and Commerce

Bengali (UG & PG)
English
Sanskrit (UG & PG)
History (UG & PG)
Political Science
Philosophy
Education
Commerce (Hons. in Accounting & Finance)

Academic Faculties

Chemistry
1. DR. TARUN TAPAN ROY [M.Sc., Ph.D]

2. DR. PRANAB KUMAR MONDAL [M.Sc., Ph.D]

3. DR. SATYAJIT DEY [M.Sc., Ph.D]

4.  MR. DHRUBAJYOTI MAJUMDAR [M.Sc., Ph.D]

5. DR. DIPANKAR MISHRA [M.Sc., Ph.D]

Accreditation
The college is recognized by the University Grants Commission (UGC).  It was accredited by the National Assessment and Accreditation Council (NAAC), and awarded A grade.

See also

References

External links
 Tamralipta Mahavidyalaya

Colleges affiliated to Vidyasagar University
Educational institutions established in 1948
Universities and colleges in Purba Medinipur district
1948 establishments in West Bengal